NGC 7020 is a barred lenticular galaxy located about 140 million light-years away in the constellation Pavo. NGC 7020 was discovered by astronomer John Herschel on August 31, 1836.

Physical characteristics 
NGC 7020 has a large outer ring surrounding a bright inner hexagonal zone containing an inner ring and possibly a bar. The large outer ring is completely detached from the inner hexagonal zone of the galaxy and is dominated by numerous flocculent spiral features. The ring is knotty and bluer than the rest of the galaxy and shows where recent star formation is occurring in NGC 7020. The possible inner ring shows protruding features at the ends of its major axis therefore classifying it as a bar. The galaxy appears to be fairly free of ionized gas, which is not surprising for an early-type galaxy.

Nearby galaxies
NGC 7020 is member of a sparse group of galaxies that contains IC 5084, IC 5092, IC 5096, NGC 6943, NGC 7083, NGC 7096, NGC 7125, NGC 7126 and ESO 107-14. However, NGC 7020 is not interacting with any other galaxy in the group.

See also 
 NGC 7098
 NGC 7013
 NGC 4429  galaxy in the Virgo Cluster with a similar structure
 List of NGC objects (7001–7840)

References

External links 

Ring galaxies
Lenticular galaxies
Barred lenticular galaxies
Pavo (constellation)
7020
66291
Astronomical objects discovered in 1836